The Campeonato de Castilla (Castile Championship), or El Corte Inglés Open as it was later renamed for sponsorship reasons, was a golf tournament on the Challenge Tour, played in Spain. It was held in 1993 and 1994 at La Moraleja Golf Club in Madrid.

Winners

References

External links
Coverage on the Challenge Tour's official site

Former Challenge Tour events
Golf tournaments in Spain
1993 establishments in Spain
1994 disestablishments in Spain